ALARM (Air Launched Anti-Radiation Missile) is a British anti-radiation missile designed primarily to destroy enemy radars for the purpose of Suppression of Enemy Air Defenses (SEAD). It was used by the RAF and is still used by the Royal Saudi Air Force. The weapon was retired by the UK at the end of 2013.

History 
The Ministry of Defence received offers for a new anti-radiation missile in late 1982; British Aerospace Dynamics offered ALARM while Texas Instruments teamed with Lucas Aerospace offered its HARM missile. Defence Secretary Michael Heseltine announced the selection of ALARM on 29 July 1983. The initial order was 750 missiles for the RAF. The selection process was controversial; the battle between the contractors was bitter, the Ministry of Defence favoured ALARM to retain UK industrial capabilities while the Treasury favoured the cheaper and proven HARM.

In early 1986, BAe recognised that Royal Ordnance was having difficulties delivering the missile's motor, named Nuthatch, and began to consider alternatives. Royal Ordnance's solution to the required burn-loiter-burn characteristic of the engine was complex. In July 1987, BAe, by then the owner of Royal Ordnance, replaced the Nuthatch motor with a lower risk motor designed by Bayern-Chemie. BAe's £200 million contract for the missile was renegotiated with the price increased to £400 million and delivery pushed back from 1988 to 1990. The radar seeker was made by Marconi Defence and Space Systems (GEC) at Stanmore.

The ALARM missile was officially retired by the UK at the end of 2013, but continued to be used by the Saudis.

Features
ALARM is a fire-and-forget system, with an added loiter capability. If the target radar shuts down, the missile will deploy a parachute and descend slowly until the radar lights up. The missile will then fire a secondary motor to attack the target.

Combat use
ALARM has been used in the following conflicts:

 1991 Gulf War (Operation Granby), during which 121 missiles were used.
 Kosovo War (Operation Allied Force), during which 6 missiles were used.
 2003 invasion of Iraq (Operation Telic), during which 47 missiles were used.
 2011 Libya (Operation Ellamy).
 2015 Yemen.

Operators

Current operators
 
 Royal Saudi Air Force

Former operators
 
 Royal Air Force

Specifications
 Primary Function: Suppression of Enemy Air Defence
 Contractor: MBDA
 Power Plant: Bayern Chemie two stage solid propellant rocket motors
 Length: 4.24 m
 Diameter: 23 cm
 Wing Span: 73 cm
 Launch Weight: 268 kg
 Speed: 2455 km/h (supersonic)
 Warhead: Proximity fused high-explosive
 Range: 93 km
 Fuse: Laser Proximity
 Guidance system: Pre-programmed/passive radar seeker
 Unit Cost: undisclosed
 Date Deployed: 1990
 User: UK (RAF)
 Tornado GR.4
 Tornado F3: fitted in time for 2003 Gulf War, receiving designation Tornado EF3
 Weapon has been "fit checked" on other RAF aircraft, such as the Jaguar. Due to its relatively large weight it is not suited to the entire RAF fleet.
 Also was expected to be usable on the Eurofighter Typhoon, but this requirement was deleted.

See also

 AGM-122 Sidearm
 AGM-78 Standard ARM
 AGM-45 Shrike
 ARMAT
 Kh-28
 Kh-31
 Kh-58
 LD-10
 MAR-1
 Martel
 Rudram-1
 YJ-91

References

External links 

 RAF: ALARM description
 Bayern-Chemie—Development and production of a rocket motor used by ALARM. More than 1,200 produced
 Matra-BAe Dynamics ALARM at Eurofighter Typhoon—a brief history of ALARM
 RAF Weapons at armedforces.co.uk

Anti-radiation missiles of the Cold War
Anti-radiation missiles of the United Kingdom
Cold War air-to-surface missiles of the United Kingdom
General Electric Company
Military equipment introduced in the 1990s